Beatrice of France or Beatrice of Paris (c. 938 - 23 September 1003) was Duchess consort of Upper Lorraine by marriage to Frederick I, Duke of Upper Lorraine, and regent of Upper Lorraine in 978-980 during the minority of her son Thierry I.

Life
Beatrice was a daughter of Hugh the Great and Hedwig of Saxony, making her sister of Hugh Capet and niece of Otto I. 

In 954, she married Frederick I, Duke of Upper Lorraine. 

After her husband's death in 978 she acted as regent to her son Thierry during his minority, officially until 978, but effectively until 980. 

She travelled to Otto II's court in Verona in 983.

Issue
 Henry (died between 972 and 978)
 Adalbero II (958–1005), bishop of Verdun and Metz
Thierry I (965–1026), count of Bar and duke of Upper Lorraine
 Ida (970-1026), married in 1010 Radbot, Count of Habsburg (970-1027), who built the castle of Habichtsburg and is thus an ancestor of the great Habsburg family which dominated Europe in the sixteenth century.

Notes

Sources

External links
http://mittelaltergazette.de/11792/wissenswertes/beatrix-von-franzien-graefin-von-bar-und-herzogin-von-lotharingen/
http://www.manfred-hiebl.de/mittelalter-genealogie/robertiner_herzoege_von_franzien/beatrix_von_franzien_herzogin_von_oberlothringen_nach_987.html

930s births
1003 deaths
Year of birth uncertain

Robertians
10th-century women rulers
10th-century German women
10th-century German nobility
10th-century French women
10th-century French nobility